The Cainarachi poison frog (Ameerega cainarachi) is a species of frogs in the family Dendrobatidae. It is endemic to Amazonian Peru and found in the lowlands adjacent to the northern end of the Eastern Andes. It was named after the Rio Cainarache Valley, where it was first discovered.

Taxonomy
The species was placed in Ameerega in the major revision of dendrobatids in 2006.

Description
Males measure  and females  in snout–vent length. The back of this species is red. The sides are black.

Habitat and conservation
It is threatened by habitat loss caused by agriculture (e.g., coffee and livestock production) and subsistence wood collection.

References

Ameerega
Amphibians of Peru
Endemic fauna of Peru
Amphibians described in 1989
Taxonomy articles created by Polbot